Risbyholm is a manor house located in Roskilde Municipality, near Havdrup, some 30 km southwest of Copenhagen, Denmark. The estate covers 528 hectares and comprises the farms Solrødgård, Ørnesæde and Klarkærgård.

History
Risby was originally owned by the bishops of Roskilde. After the Reformation, the area came under Roskildegård.

The manor was founded as  Benzonseje in 1721 when Peder Benzon, a Supreme Court justice, obtained the king's permission to merge several farms. The half-timbered main building was built the following year. In 1787, John Brown, a Scottish-born merchant and ship owner, purchased the property in auction for 60,000 Danish rigsdaler. In 1788, he sold it to his brother, David Brown, the governor of Tranquebar, who sold it again the following year. Anna Hebert, the widow after the previous owner, Christian Frederik Harald, changed the name of the property to Risbyholm in 1903.

Today
The estate has a total  area of 540 hectares of which 522 hectares are farmland and six hectares are woodland.

Owners
 (1721-1737) Peder Benzon
 (1737-1755) Kirstine Catharine Leegaard, gift Schumacher
 (1755-1775) Carl Christian Schumacher
 (1775-1784) Nikolaj Frederik Schumacher
 (1784-1788) John Brown
 (1788-1789) David Brown
 (1789-1804) Lars Lassen
 (1804) L. Olsen
 (1804-1829) Edvard Sneedorph Hammer
 (1829-1834) various owners
 (1834-1857) August Busck
 (1857-1873) P. A. Herbert
 (1873-1903) Christian Frederik Harald Holme
 (1903-1917) Anna Hebert, gift Holme
 (1917-1928) N. P. Nielsen
 (1928-1940) Carl G. Udsen
 (1940-1968) C. G. Udsen
 (1968-1998) Vagn Clausen
 (1988-2008) Claus Clausen
 (2001-2008) Christian Clausen
 (2008- )    Risbyholm Aps

References

Houses in Roskilde Municipality
Houses completed in 1782
1782 establishments in Denmark
Buildings and structures associated with the Benzon  family